Ubaldini is an Italian surname. Notable people with the surname include:

Domenico di Bartolommeo Ubaldini or Domenico Puligo (1492–1527), Italian painter of the Florentine Renaissance
Federigo Ubaldini (1610 - 1657) Italian Dante and Petrarch scholar, and secretary to papal consitory
Migliorino Ubaldini (active 1548), Italian military engineer working in Scotland
Ottaviano or Attaviano degli Ubaldini (1214 – 1273), Italian cardinal
Petruccio Ubaldini (1524–1600), Italian calligraphist and illuminator on vellum who worked in England
Roberto Ubaldini (1581–1635), bishop and cardinal of the Catholic Church
Ruggieri degli Ubaldini (active 1271 – 1295), Italian archbishop, mentioned in Dante's Inferno
Saúl Ubaldini (1936–2006), Argentine labor leader and parliamentarian for the Peronist Justicialist Party

Italian-language surnames

es:Ubaldini